Acraephnes innubila is a moth in the family Depressariidae. It was described by Alfred Jefferis Turner in 1927. It is found in Australia, where it has been recorded from Tasmania.

References

Moths described in 1927
Acraephnes
Taxa named by Alfred Jefferis Turner
Moths of Australia